Caramagna Piemonte is a comune (municipality) in the Province of Cuneo in the Italian region Piedmont, located about  south of Turin and about  northeast of Cuneo.

Caramagna Piemonte borders the following municipal lands: Carmagnola, Racconigi, and Sommariva del Bosco.

History
The name of Caramagna appears for the first time in 1026. The foundation of the Monastery of Santa Maria by the marquis of Turin Olderico greatly increased the power of the country, which extended its interests around the southern Piedmont and Liguria.

The monastery was entrusted to the care of the nuns of the Order of St. Benedict; the same order was later replaced by the equivalent male order and later by the  Girolamiti.

In 1250 Caramagna moved towards an organization of municipal type. In 1544 Caramagna was burned by the Spanish army. In 1690 an army of 15,000 French destroyed the town.

Main sights
 City Hall, the seat of the Municipality of Caramagna Piemonte
 Tower of the Old Council, used for exhibitions and events
 Church of "Assunzione di Maria Vergine" and the nearby Abbey 
 Church "Arciconfraternita di Santa Croce"
 The House of the "Beata Caterina"

Economy
The 18% of the population are farmers, cultivating fodder coming from meadows, fields produce mainly corn. These products provide a good meat production and a lot of milk; the factory "Fattorie Osella" works more than 100,000 kg daily producing cheeses.

Other economical activities include engineering, manufacturing and packaging laminated, handicraft and trade.

Sport
The sports hall of Caramagna hosts the home matches of the team CLD Carmagnola, futsal team that play in serie A2.

Twin towns
 Alicia, Argentina
 Aquilonia, Italy

References

External links
 Official website

Cities and towns in Piedmont